Maurice Poli (2 December 1933 – 26 April 2020) was a French actor, mainly active in Italian productions. He is regarded as one of the few actors to have taken part in virtually all the genres developed in Italy in over more than thirty years.

Biography

Born in Bizerte, Tunisia, Poli made his film debut in 1961, in a very small role in Mauro Bolognini's The Lovemakers. He later alternated leading roles and supporting roles, being often cast as a tough guy or a villain. He was also a TV star, taking a successful supporting role on Belle and Sebastian and the lead role on the short-lived spy series Frédéric le Gardian. Following a fashion of the time for American-sounding stage names, in the second half of the 1960s he was credited Monty Greenwood in several Spaghetti Westerns.

After retiring, he took up residence in Rome, Italy and devoted himself to his lifelong hobbies of geology and archaeology.

Selected filmography 

 The Lovemakers (1961) - (uncredited)
 The Longest Day (1962) - Jean (uncredited)
 The Avenger (1962) - Mezensio, Turno's Henchman
 Sandokan the Great (1963) - Girobatol
 The Glass Cage (1965) - Antoine
 Seven Golden Men (1965) - Alfred
 Seven Golden Men Strike Again (1966) - Alfred
 Tom Dollar (1967) - Tom Dollar
 Two Faces of the Dollar (1967) - Miele / Honey / Django
 Shark! (1969) - Mario
 The Battle of the Damned (1969) - Corporal Marwell
 Gangster's Law (1969) - Rino Quintero
 Five Dolls for an August Moon (1970) - Nick Chaney
 Shango (1970) - Martinez
 The Last Traitor (1971) - Tim
 Baron Blood (1972) - Land Surveyor (uncredited)
 Le mille e una notte all'italiana (1972)
 Life Is Tough, Eh Providence? (1972) - Sheriff Keensburg
 Lo chiamavano Tresette... giocava sempre col morto (1973)
 White Fang (1973) - Mountie
 La padrina (1973)
 Rabid Dogs (1974) - Dottore
 Legend of the Sea Wolf (1975)
 Mimì Bluette... fiore del mio giardino (1976)
 Return of the 38 Gang (1977) - Maurice
 Papaya, Love Goddess of the Cannibals (1978) - Vincent
 Cindy's Love Games (1979) - Stefan
 La cameriera seduce i villeggianti (1980) - Il marsigliese
 Malombra (1984) - Osvaldo Raininger
 Il peccato di Lola (1984) - Necklace buyer
 Maladonna (1984) - Osvaldo Raininger
 Roma. L'antica chiave dei sensi (1984) - Ptolomeus
 The Assisi Underground (1985) - Vito
 Il piacere (1985) - Boris the stableman (uncredited)
 Mai con le donne (1985)
 Mercenari dell'apocalisse (1987) - The Reverent
 Penombra (1987) - Osvaldo Raininger
 Cobra nero (1987) - Chief Max Walker
 Urban Warriors (1987) - Stan
 Touch of Death (1988) - TV Newscaster #1 (uncredited)
 Non aver paura della zia Marta (1988) - Thomas the caretaker
 Fuoco incrociato (1988) - General Romero
 Miami Cops (1989)
 La vendetta (1989) - Milo (uncredited)
 La storia di Lady Chatterley (1989)
 Massacre (1989) - Frank
 Obsession - una storia di straordinaria follia (1989)
 Casa di piacere (1989) - Antique Dealer
 La mia preda (1990)
 Hansel e Gretel (1990) - Commissioner Roy
 Detective Malone (1991) - Chief Max Walker
 Frankenstein 2000 - Ritorno dalla morte (1991) - Hoffner
 Sul filo del rasoio (1992) - Real-estate agent (uncredited)
 Rose rosse per una squillo (1993)
 Le occasioni di una signora per bene (1993)
 Delitti a luce rossa (1996) - Carlo
 Crazy Blood (2006) - Pietro
 Cruel (2014) - Gabriel Tardieu (final film role)

References

External links 

1933 births 
2020 deaths
Tunisian male film actors
French male film actors
Male Spaghetti Western actors
20th-century French male actors
People from Bizerte